The July 2011 Chilean winter storm was a winter storm affecting the Andean portions of Biobío, including Ñuble Province, and Araucanía regions in south-central Chile. Trough the Andean valleys thousands of persons were left isolated because of heavy snowfall. In some sectors blackouts occurred. Avalanches left the tourist facilities of Termas de Chillán isolated. There was a loss of livestock, mainly sheep as concequence of the storm.

The Chilean Air Force made an operation to deliver supplies to isolated localities. Defense minister Andrés Allamand visited the affected area.

See also
White Earthquake

References 

Weather events in Chile
2011 in Chile
2011 meteorology
History of Ñuble Region
History of Biobío Region
History of Araucanía Region
Chile